Eyes of Love may refer to:
 Eyes of Love (1951 film), a West German drama film
 Eyes of Love (1959 film), a French-Italian romantic drama film